Luísa of Braganza, Duchess of Cadaval (January 9, 1679 in Lisbon – December 23, 1732 in Évora) was a natural daughter of Portuguese King Peter II and a Portuguese lady named Maria da Cruz Mascarenhas.

She was raised among the family of secretary of state Francisco Correia de Lacerda and after that at the Monastery of Carnide with her aunt Maria of Braganza (natural daughter of John IV of Portugal). Luísa married D. Luís and after his death married D. Jaime de Melo, respectively 2nd and 3rd dukes of Cadaval.

She died in Évora, Alentejo, and is buried at the Convent of Saint John the Evangelist in the same city.

References
"D. Luísa. filha de D. Pedro II: uma princesa duas vezes duquesa" by Luís de Bivar Guerra, in "Miscelânia Histórica de Portugal", nº 2, 1982

1679 births
1732 deaths
House of Braganza
Illegitimate children of Portuguese monarchs
People from Lisbon
17th-century Portuguese people
18th-century Portuguese people